This article is a list of tornadoes that have impacted the central business district (downtown or city center) of a large city (that is, one having at least 50,000 people, not counting suburbs or outlying communities, at the time of the storm).

It is a common myth that tornadoes do not strike downtown areas. The odds are much lower due to the small areas covered, but paths can go anywhere, including over downtown areas. St. Louis, Missouri has taken a direct hit four times in less than a century. Many of the tornadoes listed were extremely destructive or caused numerous casualties, and the occurrence of a catastrophic event somewhere is inevitable.

This list is not exhaustive (listing every single tornado that has struck a downtown area or central business district of any city), as it may never be known if a tornado struck a downtown area, or if it was just a microburst (powerful downward and outward gush of wind, which cause damage from straight-line winds), particularly for older events or from areas with limited information. Downbursts often accompany intense tornadoes, extending damage across a wider area than the tornado path. When a tornado strikes a city, it is occasionally very difficult to determine whether it was a tornadic event at all or if the affected area was indeed the "downtown", "city center", or "central business district" consisting of very high population density and mid to high-rises, as opposed to other heavily urbanized/built-up parts of the city or suburbs. It is sometimes also difficult to determine tornadoes that strike urban cores before 1950, when tornado records (particularly in the US) started to be consistently logged with detail. Before this, lack of details on information from the events, as well as that most cities were far smaller in area and population complicate the record.

For the list of cities that are not listed here for certain reasons, see below.

North America
Note: The F-Scale was superseded by the EF scale in the U.S. on February 1, 2007, and in Canada on April 1, 2013
For tornadoes and cities in: United States, Canada, Mexico, Bahamas, Cuba, Central America, and The Caribbean. Ratings for tornadoes in the United States prior to 1950 are not official and instead estimates made by tornado expert Tom Grazulis.

South America 
South America has no default tornado strength measurement system, so the storms here will be listed using the Fujita Scale.

Europe 
Note: The UK uses the TORRO scale.

Africa 
Africa has no default tornado strength measurement system, so the storms here will be listed using the Fujita Scale.

Asia 
Most of Asia has no default tornado strength measurement system (though Japan has been known to use the Fujita Scale in the past), so the storms here will be listed using the Fujita Scale.

Notable absences 
The 1985 Barrie Tornado that struck Barrie, Ontario would be listed here, had it struck today. It is not listed, however, since the town's population was under 50,000 at the time. The tornado that hit Grand Valley, Ontario is not listed for similar reasons. Similarly, the 1999 Oklahoma tornado outbreak that spawned the deadly F5 tornado which struck Oklahoma City and some of its suburbs, including Moore and Midwest City, is not listed because it did not reach the downtown core of Oklahoma City. The 2013 Moore tornado is also not included for the same reason.

Similarly, the downtown areas of two then-small towns (now large cities) in North Carolina were struck during the 1884 Enigma outbreak: Concord and Cary. Downtown Concord was struck a second time by a tornado in May 1936.

The 1987 Edmonton Tornado is likewise not listed because it struck industrial parks, trailer parks, and suburban areas, and was far away from Edmonton's downtown core. The "Oak Lawn tornado" of April 21, 1967 which killed 33 people, mostly those in rush hour traffic at a busy intersection, and moved across southern Chicago onto Lake Michigan is not included because it missed the downtown core. Most recently, the 2008 Memphis tornado on February 5, 2008, also missed the downtown area (by a significant distance).

The Flint–Worcester tornado outbreak sequence in 1953 produced several tornadoes that struck metropolitan areas. However, none of the tornadoes hit downtown areas, moving through areas just north or west of the city cores. Therefore, these twisters are not included.

The 1998 tornado that hit Spencer, South Dakota, killing six people, the 2000 tornado that hit a campground, killing 12 people, the 2007 tornado that hit Greensburg, Kansas, killing 11 people, the Elie, Manitoba tornado that hit Elie, Manitoba in 2007 with no fatalities, and the 2009 tornado that hit Durham, Ontario, killing one person, are not listed because none of these tornadoes hit a metropolitan area that had a population higher than 50,000. The Southern Ontario tornado outbreak of 2005 that hit Toronto was not confirmed and is therefore not listed.

The devastating and violent EF5 tornado that hit Joplin, Missouri in 2011 is not listed as the population at the time the tornado hit was around 48,000. The tornado also did not impact downtown.

Another notable absence is the July 7, 1915 storm that struck Cincinnati, killing 38 people. This was determined to be most likely a windstorm causing downbursts or even a series of microbursts (with much of the damage coming from the straight-line winds), and not a tornado.

European tornadoes that are listed before 1950 are for cities that had at least 50,000 people in them at the time. Tornadoes dating back to 1054 are confirmed, due to extensive record-keeping for many weather events and other until-then unexplained weather occurrences.

On September 8, 2010, Tropical Storm Hermine went over the state of Texas and produced a few tornadoes in the Dallas–Fort Worth metroplex. One notable tornado was located in an industrialized area west of downtown Dallas before it lifted up over Interstate 35E just south of Dallas Love Field. Similarly, the 1957 Dallas tornado hit areas northwest and north and downtown, missing the core of the city. The May 26, 1976 and October 20, 2019, Dallas tornadoes were also not listed for the same reasons (striking the northern Dallas neighborhoods in an almost identical track between each other).

The city of Auckland in New Zealand has experienced multiple fatal tornadoes in its history, including one in 2012 which killed 3 people. However, none of these tornadoes have reached the downtown district of the city.

On December 10, 2021, the city of Mayfield, Kentucky was devastated by a violent tornado. The tornado carved a path straight through the entire downtown portion of the city. Despite being classified a city, the population is only about 10,000, therefore it did not qualify for this list.

See also 

 List of tornadoes and tornado outbreaks
 List of European tornadoes and tornado outbreaks
 List of North American tornadoes and tornado outbreaks
 List of Canadian tornadoes
 List of Southern Hemisphere tornadoes and tornado outbreaks
 List of F5 and EF5 tornadoes
 List of F4 and EF4 tornadoes
 List of F4 and EF4 tornadoes (2010–2019)
 List of F4 and EF4 tornadoes (2020–present)
 Urban climate and climatology

References

External links 
 Downtown Tornadoes (Storm Prediction Center)
 Major cities not immune from twisters (USA Today)
 Virginia's Weather History
 The tornadic thunderstorm events during the 1998-1999 South African summer

Cities
Tornadoes